James Blake was the defending champion.
Sam Querrey won the final after defeating Paolo Lorenzi 6–1, 6–7(3–7), 6–3 in the final.

Seeds

Draw

Finals

Top half

Bottom half

References
 Main draw
 Qualifying draw

2012 ATP Challenger Tour
2012 Singles